Walter Price (24 March 1886 – 29 July 1944) was an Australian cricketer, who played a single first-class match: for South Australia against Victoria in the 1913-14 Sheffield Shield. He scored 7 and 5 not out, and took the wickets of Eugene Carroll and Carl Willis.

Price was born in Hawthorn, South Australia; he died in Adelaide at the age of 58.

External links
 

1886 births
1944 deaths
Australian cricketers
South Australia cricketers
Cricketers from Adelaide